Arsis is an American death metal band from Virginia Beach, Virginia, formed in 2000. The band is currently signed to Nuclear Blast.

History

Demos and Willowtip era (2000–2006) 
Arsis was started by James Malone and Michael "Mike" Van Dyne in 2000, who met while attending the Berklee College of Music in Boston. The name Arsis comes from the musical term arsis and thesis meaning up and down beats. They recorded two demos independently in 2001 and 2002, which were later officially released by Negative-Existence Records in 2007. Arsis signed to Willowtip Records in 2003 and released their highly acclaimed debut album, A Celebration of Guilt, in 2004, which later ranked #50 on Decibel Magazine's "Top 100 Death Metal Albums of All Time" list. This was followed by the release of A Diamond for Disease in 2005, and United in Regret in 2006. During this time, Arsis toured heavily, sharing national stages with Six Feet Under, Full Blown Chaos, Misery Index, Mortician, Incantation, The Chasm, Necrophagist, Cattle Decapitation, Neuraxis, Alarum, Job for a Cowboy, Animosity, Ion Dissonance, Dead to Fall, Misery Signals, The Faceless, All Shall Perish, Napalm Death, and A Life Once Lost, and performed on the main stage at the 2004 Maryland Deathfest, the 2006 New England Metal and Hardcore Festival, and the First Annual California Metalfest.

The band's main composer, singer/guitarist/songwriter James Malone, wrote and performed all the guitar, vocal, and bass work on the first studio album, A Celebration of Guilt, as well as the follow-up, A Diamond for Disease.  Malone also composed and performed a score for the off-Broadway ballet company Ballet Deviare. He has a signature model for Washburn Guitars.

Mike Van Dyne performed drums on all of Arsis' releases and tours up until early 2007, and recorded/toured again with the band from 2009 until 2011. Van Dyne went on to record and perform live with The Final Sleep.

We Are the Nightmare and lineup changes (2007–2008) 
The band signed to Nuclear Blast just before original drummer Van Dyne departed; he was replaced by Darren Cesca.  Noah Martin, who played bass on United in Regret, and Ryan Knight were also added to the lineup to record We Are the Nightmare (2008), their first album with Nuclear Blast. That summer 2008, Arsis played on the Thrash & Burn tour.

Cesca was let go in 2008, with differences in musical direction provided as the reason; he was replaced on tour by Alex Tomlin of Battlemaster and later by Shawn Priest. Martin quit the band in the fall of 2008 to finish his college degree. In late 2008, Nick Cordle (guitar) and David Kinkade (drums) joined the band, and in December Knight left Arsis to join The Black Dahlia Murder.

On March 18, 2009, Malone issued a statement explaining and apologizing for recent tour cancellations and lineup changes, citing personal reasons.  Soon after, it was announced that original drummer Mike Van Dyne would return (although due to career commitments, his ability to tour with the band may be limited).

Starve for the Devil (2009–2011) 
In July 2009, it was announced that work was ongoing for their next record, Starve for the Devil.  In September, recording sessions began with Nathaniel Carter performing bass and production being handled again by Zeuss.  The record was released on February 9, 2010, and landed at No. 13 on the Billboard Top New Artist Albums (Heatseekers) chart, making Starve for the Devil the highest charting Arsis album.

In October and November 2009, Arsis toured Europe with Behemoth, DevilDriver, and Scar Symmetry on the Neckbreakers Ball Tour.

In January 2010, Arsis released a music video for "Forced to Rock", the first track off Starve for the Devil.

In January and February 2010, Arsis toured the U.S. and Canada with Arch Enemy, Exodus, and Mutiny Within on the Tyrants of Evil North American Tour.

On March 6, 2010, Arsis performed at the Eye Scream Metal Fest II in Mexico City (the band's first ever performance in Latin America) with Sacred Reich, Cynic, Municipal Waste, and Dying Fetus. This festival, the Tyrants of Evil Tour, and the Neckbreakers Ball Tour are the only times the full Starve for the Devil recording lineup performed live.

On May 13, 2010, Noah Martin rejoined the band, despite staying enrolled in college, following the departure of Nathaniel Carter.

In November 2010, the lineup of Malone, Cordle, Martin, and Van Dyne toured Europe extensively with Misery Index, Grave, The Last Felony, and The Rotted, followed by a U.S. headlining tour in December with Powerglove and Conducting from the Grave. During their headlining dates, Arsis performed the 12+ minute track "A Diamond for Disease" in its entirety for the first time ever.

On August 9, 2011, Willowtip Records reissued Arsis' acclaimed debut album A Celebration of Guilt with two bonus tracks and expanded artwork.

Unwelcome (2011–2017) 
News of demos and samples of a new full-length record starting pouring out in early 2012.  Not long after, however, guitarist Nick Cordle left the band to join Arch Enemy. Shortly after that, longtime drummer and founding member Mike Van Dyne departed Arsis to concentrate on his career full-time.

On March 13, 2012, Arsis released a demo song entitled "Choking on Sand" featuring Malone on vocals and both guitars and Noah Martin on bass.

On April 6, Arsis announced Shawn Priest as Mike Van Dyne's replacement and reposted the demo song "Choking on Sand" with Shawn on the recording.

Tracking for the as-of-then still untitled full-length record produced by Mark Lewis began on June 4.
Raw video footage from the recording sessions was posted by the band on Facebook on July 19.

On July 27, 2012, the album art and title for Unwelcome were made public.

On December 4, 2012, Arsis released an EP entitled Lepers Caress preceding the release of Unwelcome containing new songs that would be on the full-length record as well as some re-recordings from their earlier catalog.

On April 30, 2013, Arsis released Unwelcome.

In 2014, Willowtip Records reissued Arsis' A Diamond for Disease EP and United in Regret album with bonus live video tracks and expanded artwork.

In 2015, Arsis supported Sepultura on their 30th Anniversary tour, they were also joined by Destruction and Starkill.

In 2016, Arsis released their pre-production demo which is titled "As Deep As Your Flesh". They also opened up for Scar Symmetry once again on their North American tour alongside Shattered Sun and Painted in Exile.

Visitant (2018–present) 
In November 2018, Arsis released Visitant.

Members 
Current members
James Malone – lead vocals, rhythm guitar (2000–present), lead guitar (2000–2006, 2018–present), bass (2000–2006)
Noah Martin – bass, backing vocals (2006–2008, 2010–present)
Shawn Priest – drums (2008, 2012–present)

Former members
Mike Van Dyne – drums (2000–2007, 2009–2011)
Nathaniel Carter – bass (2009–2010)
Brandon Ellis – lead guitar (2012–2018)
Nick Cordle – lead guitar (2008–2012)
Ryan Knight – lead guitar (2006–2008)
Darren Cesca – drums (2007–2008)

Touring/Session members
Mike Parks – lead vocals (2007, 2012)
Justin Shaw – bass (2004–2006)
Mike Mullen – bass (2003)
Alex Cox – bass (2006)
Michael Leon – bass (2015)
Taylor Washington – lead guitar (2018–2019)
"Fast" Chris Jones – lead guitar (2003–2004)
Jake Ososkie – lead guitar (2004–2005)
Johnny Allen – lead guitar (2006)
Jon Fralick – lead guitar (2006)
David Kinkade – drums (2008–2009)
Alex Tomlin – drums (2008)
Samus – drums (70000 Tons of Metal 2011)
Scot Seguine – bass (2001 demo)
Kathy Burke – lead guitar (2001 demo)

Timeline

Discography 
Studio albums
A Celebration of Guilt (2004)
United in Regret (2006)
We Are the Nightmare (2008)
Starve for the Devil (2010)
Unwelcome (2013)
Visitant (2018)

EPs and compilations
A Diamond for Disease (2005)
As Regret Becomes Guilt: The Demos of Arsis (2007)
Lepers Caress (2012)

Music videos
We Are The Nightmare – Regular Version (2008)
We Are The Nightmare – Animated Version (2008)
Forced To Rock (2010)
Carve My Cross (2012)
Scornstar (2013)
Tricking The Gods (2018)
Fathoms (2018)

References

External links 

[ Arsis] at AllMusic

2000 establishments in Virginia
American technical death metal musical groups
American melodic death metal musical groups
Heavy metal musical groups from Virginia
Musical groups established in 2000
Musical quartets
Earache Records artists
Nuclear Blast artists